Abdulaziz Al-Mufarrej (born 21 January 1986) is a Saudi Arabian footballer who plays as a defender.

References

1986 births
Living people
Saudi Arabian footballers
Association football defenders
Al Hilal SFC players
Al-Raed FC players
Al-Riyadh SC players
Al-Najma SC players
Al-Tai FC players
Saudi Second Division players
Saudi First Division League players
Saudi Professional League players